The Durham Light Infantry Brigade was formed in 1902 to command the part-time Volunteer battalions of the Durham Light Infantry (DLI). Previously these had been in a combined Tyne and Tees Brigade with battalions of the Northumberland Fusiliers. It consisted of the 1st–4th Volunteer Battalions of the DLI (the 5th VB had remained in the Tyne Brigade), which were renumbered as the 5th–8th Battalions when the Volunteers were subsumed into the Territorial Force (TF) under the Haldane Reforms of 1908. Consisting of 6th–9th Battalions (the 5th Bn joined the York and Durham Brigade), it became part of the TF's Northumbrian Division. During World War I it was numbered as the 151st (Durham Light Infantry) Brigade on 14 May 1915, when the division became the 50th (Northumbrian) Division. The TF also raised 2nd Line units and formations, and the 190th (2nd Durham Light Infantry) Brigade was formed in 63rd (2nd Northumbrian) Division. The 1st Line battalions adopted the prefix '1/'

Order of Battle
The brigade's composition during World War I was as follows:
 1/6th Battalion, Durham Light Infantry – reduced to training cadre 15 July 1918
 1/7th Battalion, Durham Light Infantry – left on 16 November 1915 to become the divisional pioneer battalion 
 1/8th Battalion, Durham Light Infantry – reduced to training cadre 15 July 1918
 1/9th Battalion, Durham Light Infantry – left 13 February 1918
 1/5th Battalion, Loyal North Lancashire Regiment – joined 11 June 1915, left 21 December 1915
 1/5th Battalion, Border Regiment – joined from 149th (Northumberland) Brigade 20 December 1915; left 13 February 1918
 1/5th Battalion, Durham Light Infantry – joined from 150th (York and Durham) Brigade12 February 1918; reduced to training cadre 15 July 1918
 151st Machine Gun Company – formed 6 February 1916; transferred to divisional Machine Gun Battalion 1 March 1918
 151st Trench Mortar Battery – formed June 1916

After the Third Battle of the Aisne, the 50th Division was reduced to training cadres. The 151st Brigade was then reconstituted with battalions withdrawn from Salonika, giving it the following composition:
 6th Battalion, Royal Inniskilling Fusiliers
 1st Battalion, King's Own Yorkshire Light Infantry
 4th Battalion, King's Royal Rifle Corps 	
 151st Trench Mortar Battery

After the Armistice with Germany, 50th Division was disbanded in France on 19 March 1919. The old Northumbrian Division was reconstituted in April 1920.

Actions
The brigade fought in the following actions during World War I:
 Second Battle of Ypres
 Battle of St Julien (24 April – 3 May 1915)
 Battle of Frezenberg Ridge (11–13 May 1915)
 Battle of Bellewaarde Ridge (24–25 May 1915)
 Battle of the Somme
 Battle of Flers-Courcelette (15–22 September 1916)
 Battle of Morval (25–28 September 1916)
 Battle of the Transloy Ridges (1–3 October 1916)
 Battle of Arras
 First Battle of the Scarpe (11–14 April 1917)
 Capture of Wancourt Ridge (13–15 April 1917)
 Second Battle of the Scarpe (23–24 April 1917)
 Third Battle of Ypres
 Second Battle of Passchendaele (26 October – 9 November 1917)
 Battles of the Somme
 Battle of St Quentin (21–23 March 1918)
 Actions at the Somme Crossings (23 March 1918)
 Battle of Rosieres (26–27 March 1918)
 Battle of the Lys
 Battle of Estaires (9–11 April 1918)
 Battle of Hazebrouck (12 April 1918)
 Third Battle of the Aisne (27 May – 6 June 1918)
 Battles of the Hindenburg Line
 Battle of the St Quentin Canal (1 October 1918)
 Battle of the Beaurevoir Line(3–5 October 1918)
 Battle of Cambrai (8 October 1918)
 Pursuit to the Selle (11–12 October 1918)
 Final Advance in Picardy
 Battle of the Selle (17–18 October 1918)
 Battle of the Sambre (4 November 1918)

Commanders
The following officers commanded the brigade during World War I:
 Col (Brig-Gen from 5 August 1914) J.W. Sears, appointed 30 March 1913, till 16 December 1914 
 Brig-Gen H. Martin, till 4 July 1915
 Brig-Gen J.S.M. Shea, till 17 May 1916
 Brig-Gen P.T. Westmorland, till 6 September 1916
 Brig-Gen N.J.G. Cameron, till 20 October 1917
 Brig-Gen C.T. Martin, killed 27 May 1918
 Lt-Col F. Walton, acting
 Brig-Gen R.E. Sugden, from 7 June 1918

Notes

References
 Maj A.F. Becke,History of the Great War: Order of Battle of Divisions, Part 2a: The Territorial Force Mounted Divisions and the 1st-Line Territorial Force Divisions (42–56), London: HM Stationery Office, 1935/Uckfield: Naval & Military Press, 2007, .
 Maj A.F. Becke,History of the Great War: Order of Battle of Divisions, Part 2b: The 2nd-Line Territorial Force Divisions (57th–69th), with the Home-Service Divisions (71st–73rd) and 74th and 75th Divisions, London: HM Stationery Office, 1937/Uckfield: Naval & Military Press, 2007, .
 Col John K. Dunlop, The Development of the British Army 1899–1914, London: Methuen, 1938.
 Edward M. Spiers, The Army and Society 1815–1914, London: Longmans, 1980, .
 Everard Wyrall, The Fiftieth Division 1914–1919, 1939/Uckfield: Naval & Military, nd, .

External sources
 The Long, Long Trail
 The Regimental Warpath 1914–1918 (archive site)

Durham Light Infantry
Infantry brigades of the British Army
Infantry brigades of the British Army in World War I
Military units and formations established in 1915
Military units and formations in County Durham